Isaiah Williams may refer to:

 Isaiah Williams (wide receiver) (born 1987), American football wide receiver
 Isaiah Williams (offensive lineman) (born 1993), American football offensive lineman

See also
 Isiah Williams (born 1987), American football quarterback better known as Juice Williams
 Isiah Williams (basketball), American basketball player